Kingdom of Global View is a 27-story,  tall twin residential skyscraper complex located in Xinyi Special District, Taipei, Taiwan. Designed by the Taiwanese architect Chu-Yuan Lee, the residential complex was completed in 2008 and provides 122 units of luxury apartments. Famous residents include Taiwanese actress Barbie Hsu and her family.

See also 
 List of tallest buildings in Taipei
 Tao Zhu Yin Yuan
 55 Timeless
 Polaris Garden

References

2007 establishments in Taiwan
Residential skyscrapers in Taiwan
Skyscrapers in Taipei
Apartment buildings in Taiwan
Residential buildings completed in 2007